Spruce Creek is a stream in the U.S. state of West Virginia.

Spruce Creek was named for the spruce trees along its course.

See also
List of rivers of West Virginia

References

Rivers of Ritchie County, West Virginia
Rivers of West Virginia